Vappuzha is a ward in the Chazhoor panchayat in the Thrissur district of Kerala state in India. Vappuzha is a mostly a farming village.  A major festival in Vappuzha is Puthenpeedika church festival and Thoniyakavu festival.

History

Vappuzha was an ancient port of Chera dynasty which situated near the ancient town of Irumbrayur which now known as Puthenpeedika.  In ancient times, a big river were flowing through the side of the Vappuzha. The name Vappuzha were given by that river because the Malayalam meaning of Vappuzha is big river.

References 

Villages in Thrissur district